Satcom, a portmanteau of satellite communications, was a brand of artificial geo-stationary communications satellites originally developed and operated by RCA American Communications (RCA Americom) that facilitated wide-area telecommunications by receiving radio signals from Earth, amplifying them, and relaying them back down to terrestrial receivers.

Satcom was one of the early geostationary satellites; the first were the Syncom series, in 1964. The first Satcom satellite, Satcom 1, was launched on 13 December 1975. The last satellite, Satcom K2, was placed into orbit on 27 November 1985 and was de-orbited in February 2002. Satcom was first superseded and then replaced by the GE series of satellites.  

The Satcom system passed to General Electric with its purchase of RCA in 1986. RCA Americom became GE American Communications (GE Americom) and the satellite construction division became GE Astro Space. GE Astro Space was sold to Martin Marietta (now Lockheed Martin Space Systems) in 1993. In 2001, GE sold GE Americom to SES Global, creating SES Americom.

History 
Most early commercial communications satellites were built for and operated by telecommunications companies. RCA, with its own RCA Astro Electronics satellite construction business, identified a role for itself as a satellite owner/operator.

Satcom 1 was used as the launching ground for many cable TV services including HBO, Showtime, Superstation TBS, Nickelodeon, the CBN cable network (now Freeform), ESPN, and The Weather Channel.  The satellite spurred the cable television industry to unprecedented heights with the assistance of HBO (who moved their programming from the competing Westar 1, where they had been since their nationwide debut in 1975, to Satcom 1 in February 1976). Cable television networks relay signals to ground-based cable television headends using satellites, which allowed cable TV to enter into the suburban and metropolitan markets, thus allowing HBO to accumulate 1.6 million subscribers by the end of 1977.

A notable legal battle involved Ted Turner suing RCA to get a Satcom 1 transponder in 1980 for the launch of CNN on 1 June 1980. CNN had been scheduled for a Satcom 3 transponder but that satellite failed to reach geosynchronous orbit upon its launch on 7 December 1979.

Shortly after its launch, Satcom 1 was the first satellite used by broadcast TV networks in the United States. The networks ABC, NBC, and CBS distributed their programming content to some local affiliate stations, which had before relied on AT&T's terrestrial microwave and coaxial networks to distribute and relay programming (although NBC used it on an experimental basis for this purpose in the late 1970s). The networks fed to both Satcom 1 and AT&T's network at the same time (for the benefit of those stations who hadn't yet been equipped with Earth station equipment for reception of the satellite) up until the breakup of AT&T in 1984, when the networks switched exclusively to satellite distribution on Satcom 1 (and later satellites), due to the much lower transmission costs, as well as due to AT&T's divestiture itself.

The reason that Satcom 1 was so widely used by both cable and broadcast TV networks is that it had twice the communications capacity of the competing Westar 1 (24 transponders as opposed to Westar 1's 12), which resulted in lower transponder usage costs in general.

Satellite fleet 
All the remaining Satcom satellites were retired in the early 2000s and replaced by the GE/AMC series, originally by GE Americom, then sold to SES.

External links 
 Astronautix
 Sky Rocket
 Satellite Communications, 3rd Edition
 What is SwiftBroadband
Communications satellites
RCA brands